Kim Min-je born (12 September 1989) is a South Korean retired association footballer who played as a mobile defender, and could be utilized at fullback, or on the wings.

Career
Kim made his debut for the Avispa side on the opening day of the 2011 J. League Division 1 season, in a 3–0 loss to Albirex Niigata.

Club statistics

References

External links
 
 
 
 

1989 births
Living people
Association football central defenders
South Korean footballers
South Korean expatriate footballers
J1 League players
J2 League players
K League 1 players
K League 2 players
Avispa Fukuoka players
Ehime FC players
Seoul E-Land FC players
Suwon FC players
Expatriate footballers in Japan
South Korean expatriate sportspeople in Japan
Chung-Ang University alumni
Sportspeople from Busan